The 2017–18 Biathlon World Cup – Stage 8 was the 8th event of the season and was held in Oslo, Holmenkollen, Norway, from 15 March until 18 March 2018.

Schedule of events

Medal winners

Men

Women

Achievements
 Best performance for all time

 , 1st place in Sprint
 , 4th place in Pursuit

References 

2017–18 Biathlon World Cup
Biathlon World Cup
Biathlon World Cup
2010s in Oslo
Biathlon competitions in Norway
International sports competitions in Oslo